Cryptotriton is the genus of hidden salamanders in the family Plethodontidae, native to Mexico, Honduras and Guatemala. Most species in this genus are endangered or critically endangered with Cryptotriton sierraminensis being data deficient according to the IUCN.

Species
The following seven species are included in this genus:

External links
 . 2008. Amphibian Species of the World: an Online Reference. Version 5.2 (15 July 2008). Cryptotriton. Electronic Database accessible at https://web.archive.org/web/20071024033938/http://research.amnh.org/herpetology/amphibia/index.php. American Museum of Natural History, New York, USA. (Accessed: July 31, 2008). 
  [web application]. 2008. Berkeley, California: Cryptotriton. AmphibiaWeb, available at http://amphibiaweb.org/. (Accessed: July 31, 2008).

 
Taxonomy articles created by Polbot